Louis Charles Antoine de Beaufranchet, Comte de Beaufranchet d'Ayat, Seigneur d'Ayat, de Beaumont, de Saint-Hilaire, etc. (22 November 1757 – 2 July 1812) was a French general and politician under the French First Republic and French First Empire. He was the son of Marie-Louise O'Murphy and Jacques de Beaufranchet.

External links
http://www.assemblee-nationale.fr/sycomore/fiche.asp?num_dept=12765
http://www.napoleon-series.org/research/frenchgenerals/c_frenchgenerals5.html

People from Allier
1812 deaths
1757 births
French generals
French people of Irish descent
Generals of the First French Empire